Kenny Mayne (born ) is an American sports media personality who is best known for his work on ESPN from 1994 to 2021. He appeared as host of Kenny Mayne's Wider World of Sports on ESPN.com, and he appeared as a weekly contributor to Sunday NFL Countdown with his weekly "Mayne Event" segment.

Career
A native of Kent, Washington, Mayne attended community college and was an honorable mention as junior college All-American quarterback in 1978 at Wenatchee Valley College in Wenatchee, Washington. He graduated from the University of Nevada, Las Vegas in 1982 with a degree in broadcasting. While at UNLV, Mayne was a backup quarterback for two years and he later signed as a free agent with the Seattle Seahawks.

KSTW
After beginning his television career with a brief stint as a reporter for KLVX-TV in Las Vegas, Nevada, Mayne spent seven years (1982–89) at KSTW-TV in Seattle, Washington. Eventually, he became a weekend sports anchor and weekday news reporter. Mayne resigned from KSTW in 1989.

ESPN

ESPN hired Mayne in 1994 after Mayne had sent ESPN a note inquiring whether the network would hire him. The note simply asked to check a box, including one option that read, "We'll hire you when there's an ESPN5."

Mayne started at ESPN in 1994 as a SportSmash anchor on ESPN2, then became the anchor of the weekend edition of RPM 2Night from its start on Labor Day weekend 1995 until August 1997.

On his final edition of RPM 2Night, Kenny played a phone call he received from David Letterman, then a co-owner of Rahal Racing, that he could not quit doing RPM 2Night.  After that, Mayne moved over to the main network. He served, for a time, as co-anchor of the 11PM SportsCenter with Dan Patrick after Keith Olbermann left ESPN.

He left SportsCenter two years later, moving to an assortment of late night ESPN shows which were usually re-aired throughout the next morning. Included in his repertoire was the game show 2 Minute Drill. Mayne is now most often seen as the host for ABC and ESPN's horse racing events. He provided offbeat feature stories on Sunday NFL Countdown in a weekly segment called The Mayne Event. 

On January 17, 2007, ESPN signed Mayne to a one-year contract to do features and cover horse racing, as well as return to SportsCenter for about 50 shows in 2007.

Beginning October 2, 2008, Mayne starred in ESPN's first scripted web series, Mayne Street, playing a fictionalized version of himself.

In 2011, ESPN launched Kenny Mayne's Wider World of Sports, a series of videos on ESPN.com highlighting Mayne's trips around the world. In the first season the show visited six countries (England, Ireland, Brazil, South Africa, Thailand, and New Zealand) with Mayne participating in events like the King's Cup Elephant Polo tournament in Thailand, the world's longest par-3 hole (Extreme 19) in South Africa, and a road bowling match in Ireland.

A television version of Kenny Mayne's Wider World of Sports, featuring highlights from the internet series, aired on ESPN/ABC in December 2011. Season 2 of Wider World of Sports featured visits to the Netherlands for canal jumping, Nicaragua for volcano boarding, Italy for the Palio di Siena horse race, Bosnia and Herzegovina for bridge diving at Stari Most, Switzerland for hornussen, and Scotland for the Highland Games. 

Both seasons of Kenny Mayne's Wider World of Sports have been honored in the Online Film and Video category of the Webby Awards, which annually recognize the best websites, videos, apps, and social media on the internet.

Mayne returned to SportsCenter on October 15, 2013, after a five-year absence. A new contract with ESPN signed earlier that month set Mayne to anchor 70 episodes of SportsCenter and host 10 special features per year through 2015. At the time Mayne described the new deal was "sort of a part-time job" and implied dissatisfaction with some of the caveats. The deal effectively ended Mayne's role on horse-racing and terminated his Wider World of Sports series instead focusing his role primarily on SportsCenter.

He commented on the restructuring of his contract by saying "for some readers it looked like I had the keys to the place, and they took the keys away".

During his time at ESPN, he became known for his dry sense of humor.

On May 10, 2021, Mayne announced that he would be departing from ESPN after 27 years as an anchor and correspondent for the network, declining a 60% pay cut.

NBC 
From July–September 2021, Mayne along with another former ESPN anchor, Cari Champion, hosted streaming coverage of the 2020 Summer Olympics on Peacock called Tokyo Tonight. Mayne, in an interview with journalist Julie Stewart-Binks, said the series will “[catch] the viewers up on what they may have not seen,”

Other ventures

In January 2006, Mayne participated in the second season of ABC's Dancing with the Stars with partner Andrea Hale, but after a disastrous cha-cha, Mayne was the first contestant to be eliminated. In an interview with Brian Falvey in the spring of 2007, Mayne joked that he left the 2006 Rose Bowl at halftime to get up early the next day to practice for Dancing with the Stars. Subsequent seasons have seen Mayne return to the show for DanceCenter, a parody of SportsCenter, alongside former contestant Jerry Rice and judge Len Goodman. DanceCenter appears on the results show night of the week in which either five or six contestants remain. 

Mayne was also in the 1998 film BASEketball, which featured the creators of South Park, Trey Parker and Matt Stone. He was alongside Dan Patrick and appeared on SportsCenter to cover the latest BASEketball playoff competition. In 1999, he played himself on an episode of The Drew Carey Show entitled "Tracy Bowl".

Before agreeing to the deal with ESPN, Mayne had talks with Comedy Central about doing a sports-themed The Daily Show-style program and was a finalist to be the host of the syndicated version of Deal or No Deal. He confirmed both discussions.

Mayne has recently appeared in commercials for Progressive auto insurance, and Top Flite golf balls. In November 2006, Mayne hosted the pilot episode of the CBS Primetime gameshow Power of 10 which would later be hosted by Drew Carey. Power of 10 producer Michael Davies was impressed with his performance on 2 Minute Drill, and wanted him to host one of his other game shows. After Mayne hosted the pilot, he declined the opportunity and it went to Drew Carey. 

In 2008, Mayne penned his first book, An Incomplete And Inaccurate History Of Sport, a collection of offbeat musings on sports and pop culture. In 2010, he appeared in the animated film Kung Fu Magoo as himself.

References

External links
 "Kenny Mayne's Wider World of Sports
 Kenny Mayne
 Extensive audio interview with Mayne on public radio program The Sound of Young America

Living people
American game show hosts
American television sports anchors
American television sports announcers
American Congregationalists
American football quarterbacks
UNLV Rebels football players
American horse racing announcers
People from Kent, Washington
Year of birth missing (living people)